Alyosha Ptitsyn Grows Up is a 1953 Soviet family comedy film directed by Anatoly Granik and starring Viktor Kargopoltsev, Olga Pyzhova and Valentina Sperantova.

Synopsis
Third-grader Alesha Ptitsyn, a little schoolboy from Moscow, decides to radically change his life; do self-education, to get rid of the guardianship of strict parents and a scattered grandmother, to live according to a strict routine and not to succumb to temptation. Having created a new schedule of the day, Alyosha starts a new life; he wakes up and gets up by himself, does his morning exercises and goes to school. At this time, Alesha's grandmother at the station misses her childhood friend, who came to stay with her granddaughter. Alesha who accidentally meets them, decides to hold a city tour of Moscow for the guests in order to restore in their eyes a true representation of the hospitable Muscovites and to correct the misstep of his grandmother.

Cast
 Viktor Kargopoltsev as Alyosha  
 Olga Pyzhova  as Alyosha grandma  
 Valentina Sperantova as Grandmother Sima  
 Natalya Polinkovskaya  
 Yuri Bublikov  as Andrey 
 Tamara Alyoshina as Natalya, Alyosha's mother  
 Nadezhda Rumyantseva as Galya  
 Roza Makagonova as Olga, student  
 Lidiya Sukharevskaya  as Lt Sergeenko  
 Sergei Podmasteryev as Gena  
 Aleksandr Mikhaylov as Tikhon Ivanovich  
 Borya Vasilev as Nikita, a friend of Alyosha  
 Natalya Seleznyova  as Sachenka (first film role)

References

External links 
 

1953 films
1953 comedy films
Soviet comedy films
Russian comedy films
1950s Russian-language films
 Lenfilm films
Soviet black-and-white films
Russian black-and-white films